Productida is an extinct order of brachiopods in the extinct class Strophomenata. Members of Productida first appeared during the Silurian. They represented the most abundant group of brachiopods during the Permian period, accounting for 45-70% of all species. The vast majority of species went extinct during the Permian-Triassic extinction event, though a handful survived into the Early Triassic. Many productids are covered in hollow tubular spines, which are characteristic of the group. A number of functions for the spines have been proposed, including as a defensive mechanism against predators.

Taxonomy
Following the Treatise
 Suborder Chonetidina
 Superfamily Chonetoidea
 Family Strophochonetidae
 Family Chonostrophiidae
 Family Anopliidae
 Family Eodevonariidae
 Family Chonetidae
 Family Rugosochonetidae
 Family Daviesiellidae
 Suborder Productidina
 Superfamily Productoidea
 Family Productellidae
 Family Productidae
 Superfamily Echinoconchoidea
 Family Echinoconchidae
 Family Sentosiidae
 Superfamily Linoproductoidea
 Family Linoproductidae
 Family Monticuliferidae
 Suborder Strophalosiidina
 Superfamily Strophalosioidea
 Family Strophalosiidae
 Family Chonopectidae
 Family Araksalosiidae
 Superfamily Aulostegoidea
 Family Aulostegidae
 Family Cooperinidae
 Family Scacchinellidae
 Superfamily Richthofenioidea
 Family Richthofeniidae
 Family Hercosiidae
 Family Cyclacanthariidae
 Family Gemmellaroiidae
 Suborder Lyttoniidina
 Superfamily Lyttonioidea
 Family Lyttoniidae
 Family Rigbyellidae
  Superfamily Permianelloidea
 Family Permianellidae

References

External links 
 
 
 

 
Brachiopod orders
Prehistoric animal orders